Roseacre may refer to:
Roseacre, Gauteng, South Africa
Roseacre, Bearsted, Kent, England
Roseacre, Lancashire, England